I Want Your Money is a 2010 American documentary film by filmmaker Ray Griggs. It contrasts Barack Obama to Ronald Reagan.

Premise
The film examines and contrasts the differences between "Reaganomics" and "Obamanomics" as American economic and governmental policies, as well as their respective impact on life in the United States of America, as summarized from film's official web site:

Two versions of the American dream now stand in sharp contrast. One views the money you earned as yours and best allocated by you. It champions the traditional American dream, which has played out millions of times through generations of Americans, of improving one's lot in life and the entrepreneurial spirit of daring to dream and to build big. The other believes that the federal government, using taxpayers' money, should play a major role in leveling out the nation's wealth to guarantee outcomes to all, regardless of effort. How America chooses between these two views of the role of government, at this crucial juncture, will have everything to do with the future we and our children and our children's children will enjoy.

The film uses computer animation, film clips, archival footage, dramatizations, music, graphics, and on-camera interviews with well-known public figures and experts "to tell the story in the plainest terms of the choice between the Obama and the Reagan views of the role of the federal government in our society."

Interviews
The following individuals were interviewed for I Want Your Money:

 Gary Bauer
 Kenneth Blackwell
 Andrew Breitbart
 Chris Edwards
 Lee Edwards
 Steve Forbes
 Alison Fraser
 Newt Gingrich
 Mike Huckabee
 Allen Icet
 Tom McClintock
 Thad McCotter
 David M. McIntosh
 Edwin Meese lll
 Stephen Moore
 Kate Obenshain
 Star Parker
 Michael Reagan
 Lila Rose
 George Runner
 Rob Schaaf
 John Stossel
 William Voegeli
 Pete Wilson

Release
The film had a limited release on October 15, 2010 in 537 theater screens, with an opening weekend box office of $249,428 USD in North American rentals.

Reception
I Want Your Money holds a critical rating score of 13% based on 8 reviews at Rotten Tomatoes.

Joe Leydon of Variety magazine called it "Equal parts hagiography and hatchet job."

References

External links
 
 
 
 
 

2010 animated films
2010 films
2010 documentary films
American animated documentary films
Documentary films about American politics
Documentary films about economics
Films about presidents of the United States
Films about Barack Obama
2010s English-language films
2010s American films